The Legend of the Unknowns (十三妹) is a TVB television series, premiered in 1983. Starring: Cecilia Wong, Kent Tong, Sharon Yeung, Barbara Yung, Simon Yam. Theme song "Heroine" (巾幗英雄) composition and arrangement by Joseph Koo, lyricist by Wong Jim, sung by Frances Yip.

Casts
 Barbara Yung as Princess Sheung

1983 Hong Kong television series debuts
1983 Hong Kong television series endings
TVB dramas
1980s Hong Kong television series
Cantonese-language television shows